Aspidura brachyorrhos, commonly known as Boie's rough-sided snake and as ලේ මැඩිල්ලා  (le medilla) in Sinhala, is a colubird species endemic to Sri Lanka. Bites from this species are known to cause mild local reaction, including a slight burning sensation and swelling.

Distribution
A small burrowing snake from midhills of central Sri Lanka. Localities recorded are Namunukula, Gampola, Weligala, Peradeniya, Gammaduwa, Dambulla, [
Kegalle] and Kandy.

Description
Head indistinct from neck, body is cylindrical. Dorsally rich orange-brown, mottled, discontinuous mid-dorsal stripes distinct. 2 rows of lateral spots. Head dark brown.

Scalation
Midbody scale rows 17. Pre-oculars present. 2 Post-oculars contact with parietal. Ventrals 134–159. Subcaudals 25–39.

Ecology
Little is known. It occurs at elevations between 610-1100m. This species is known from tea plantations and vegetable gardens, and has also been dug up from riverbanks.

Reproduction
Between 2-6 measuring 8 × 28mm are produced.

References

 http://reptile-database.reptarium.cz/species?genus=Aspidura&species=brachyorrhos
 http://www.wildreach.com/reptile/Serpentes/Aspidura%20branchyorrhos.php
 http://eol.org/pages/1057089/names
 https://www.itis.gov/servlet/SingleRpt/SingleRpt?search_topic=TSN&search_value=700770

Aspidura
Reptiles described in 1827
Reptiles of Sri Lanka
Taxa named by Friedrich Boie